N165 ("Coronation" rock) is a rock on the surface of Aeolis Palus in Gale Crater on the planet Mars near the landing site ("Bradbury Landing") of the Curiosity rover. The "approximate" site coordinates are: .
On August 19, 2012, the rock was the first target of the rover's laser instrument, ChemCam, which can analyze targets at a distance using a laser and spectrometer. A Twitter feed for the rock was created, featuring an anthropomorphized account of its experiences. Its posts include a humor themed mix of social interaction and Mars content such as "Did you know I was born in a volcano? Basalts like me come from lava. That's why we call it Olympus Mom".

The goal of this initial use of the laser on Mars was to serve as target practice for characterizing the instrument. The rock was primarily selected for its proximity to the rover, rather than any intrinsic scientific value. The rock was lasered thirty times over ten seconds. The mission's investigators thought the rock was a basalt prior to lasing, which was confirmed by preliminary results. The ChemCam team reported positive results; they worked on the instrument for eight years before getting to use it on Mars.

Images

See also
 

 Aeolis quadrangle 
 Composition of Mars 
 Geology of Mars
 List of rocks on Mars
 Timeline of Mars Science Laboratory

References

External links
Curiosity Rover - Official Site
NASA - Mars Exploration Program 
NASA - N165 - After the Laser Shots 
NASA - N165 - Rover Zaps Rock
Twitter - N165 ("Coronation" rock)  
Volcanic rock classification

Aeolis quadrangle
Mars Science Laboratory
Rocks on Mars